The Aetna-class ironclad floating batteries were built during the Crimean War for the attack of Russian coastal fortifications.

Britain and France each laid down five of these coastal attack vessels in 1854. The French used three of their batteries in 1855 against the defences at Kinburn on the Black Sea, where they were effective against Russian shore defences. The British plan to use theirs in the Baltic Sea against Kronstadt in 1856 was influential in causing the Russians to sue for peace.  The development of such iron-armoured batteries was a step towards the development of ironclad warships. "These armoured batteries were among the most revolutionary ships ever built and provided British and French designers with the germ of the battleship."

One of the British batteries, Trusty, was used for trials in 1861 with a prototype rotating turret, based on Captain Cowper Phipps Coles' designs.

Genesis

Emperor Napoleon III initiated the design of armoured steam-powered batteries for the French Navy. The original idea was to protect the sides with boxes of cannonballs, but the British engineer Thomas Lloyd suggested using thick wrought iron plates instead. Trials at Vincennes showed that Lloyd's idea was more effective, so it was adopted.

Napoleon wanted ten floating batteries built in time for the 1855 campaign, but as French industry could only build five in time, France's British allies were asked to build the other five.  Unfortunately the First Lord, Sir James Graham, confused this concept with the unsuccessful iron-hulled frigates built in the late 1840s, and asked for further trials, so the British armoured batteries were not ordered until 4 October 1854.

Design

These vessels were copies of the French Dévastation-class batteries. The French batteries carried 16 guns, but had 24 gun ports. The Admiralty design drawing showed them with 32 gunports. These ports were very large  – .

The wooden-hulled Aetna class had "straight vertical sides and a flat bottom with a very bluff bow and stern. Their armour plates, nominally 4 inches (102 mm), but in many cases were rolled  under thickness, were locked together with tongue and groove joints." The iron armour was supported by  oak sides. There were two conning towers protected by  wrought iron plate.

In October 1858, experimental firing trials were undertaken against Meteor and one of the follow-on class of iron-hulled armoured batteries, . These demonstrated the importance of wooden backing for the armour, as Meteor put up far better resistance than Erebus, where the frames were displaced by concussion.

Machinery

Although they were completed as single screw vessels, Meteor  was altered to triple screw with wing-shafts; her trials with triple screw were 12 days after her trials with single screw. The most likely method of driving the wing shafts was a belt arrangement, which was common practice at the time. It is unclear whether any of the others were also altered to triple-screw.

On her trials fitted as triple screw, Meteor reached  at 139 rpm. The two wing screws on this trial were  diameter,  pitch.

The second Aetna had two-cylinder  diameter  stroke horizontal single expansion engines of 200 nhp. Her boilers were salvaged from the first Aetna.

Building programme

Admiralty records for Meteor, Thunder, Glatton and Trusty state that both the Mare and the Green yards were at Limehouse, other vessels built by Mare and by Green were built at Blackwall. It is possible that there is an error in the records, and they were actually built at Blackwall.

Service
The first Aetna was to have been launched on 5 May 1855, but caught fire on the building slip, and launched herself two days early. Her remains were broken up on the river-bank. Her replacement, the second Aetna was finished too late for the Crimean War, and was fitted for harbour service in 1866. She burnt out at Sheerness in 1873 and was broken up in 1874.

Meteor and Glatton were ready in 1855 but reached the Black Sea too late for action. Both were laid up in theatre for the winter, and in the Spring, when peace was signed, they returned home for the great review of April 1856. Thunder and Trusty also took part in the review.

Meteor was used in experimental firing trials in October 1858. She was broken up in 1861.

Trusty was used in trials of the new Armstrong 40-pounder BL in January 1859 and the 100-pounder BL in September 1859; contrary to expectations, hits on her armour from the 40-pounder and 100-pounder had no serious effect.  She was used in trials with a prototype Coles turret in 1861 and in so doing became the first warship to be fitted with a turret. She was broken up by Castle at Charlton in 1864. Glatton was also broken up in 1864.

Thunder was broken up at Chatham in June 1874.

Footnotes

Ironclad floating batteries
 
Floating batteries of the Royal Navy